Arvindrao Laxmanrao Apte  (24 October 1934 – 5 August 2014) was an Indian cricketer who played in one Test in 1959 against England at Leeds. His brother Madhav Apte was also a cricketer.

See also
One Test Wonder

References

1934 births
2014 deaths
India Test cricketers
Indian cricketers
Mumbai cricketers
Rajasthan cricketers
Indian Universities cricketers
Cricketers from Mumbai